Dilema is an Indonesian drama film released on 23 February 2012, and produced by Wulan Guritno and Adilla Dimitri. The film stars Tio Pakusadewo, Wulan Guritno, Lukman Sardi, Abimana Aryasatya, Ario Bayu, Slamet Rahardjo, Baim Wong, Pevita Pearce, Winky Wiryawan, and Jajang C. Noer. Dilema also premiered in the Australia and unfortunately, the film received a failure in the number of spectators in Indonesia, totally 30.000.

The film was nominated for "Favorite Film" at the 2012 Indonesian Movie Awards and won "Best Feature Film" at the 2012 DetectiveFEST Moscow in Russia.

Segments

The film is arranged into several segments, each with its own cast and director.

Big Boss
 Director: Rinaldy Puspoyo
 Roy Marten as Sony Wibisono
 Jajang C. Noer as Hetty
 Reza Rahadian as Adrian
 Abimana Aryasatya as Barry
 Verdi Solaiman as Suryo/Bodyguard 1

The Officer
 Director: Lim Dimitri
 Ario Bayu as Bayu Sustoyo
 Tio Pakusadewo as Bowo

Rendezvous
 Director: Yudi Datau
 Pevita Pearce as Dian
 Wulan Guritno as Rima

The Gambler
 Director: Robert Ronny
 Slamet Rahardjo as Sigit
 Ray Sahetapy as Gilang
 Lukman Sardi as Andri

Garis Keras
 Director: Robby Ertanto Soediskam
 Baim Wong as Ibnu
 Winky Wiryawan as Said
 Kenes Andari as Sesi

Awards

References

External links
 
 Ulasan di Cineplex

Indonesian drama films